Big Records is an independent record label based in Sydney, Australia. It was founded by Paul Paoliello, former Managing Director of Zomba Records' Australasian affiliate from its inception in 1999 until its sale to Rajon Music Group in 2003.  Its artists include Tina Cousins, The Teenage Idols, 888, Melissa Tkautz, Groove Armada, Ashanti, Melanie C, Hanson and Big Night.

See also
Lists of record labels
Bertelsmann Music Group

References

Australian independent record labels
Defunct record labels of Australia
Record labels established in 1999
Record labels disestablished in 2003
Pop record labels
Record labels based in Sydney
1999 establishments in Australia